
Gmina Stromiec is a rural gmina (administrative district) in Białobrzegi County, Masovian Voivodeship, in east-central Poland.

Villages
Gmina Stromiec contains the villages and settlements of Biała Góra, Bobrek, Bobrek-Kolonia, Boska Wola, Boże, Dobieszyn, Ducka Wola, Grabowy Las, Kolonia Sielce, Krzemień, Ksawerów Nowy, Ksawerów Stary, Lipskie Budy, Małe Boże, Marianki, Matyldzin, Mokry Las, Nętne, Niedabyl, Olszowa Dąbrowa, Pietrusin, Piróg, Podlesie Duże, Pokrzywna, Sielce, Stara Wieś, Stromiec, Stromiecka Wola, Sułków and Zabagnie.

Neighbouring gminas
Gmina Stromiec is bordered by the gminas of Białobrzegi, Głowaczów, Grabów nad Pilicą, Jedlińsk, Stara Błotnica and Warka.

References
Polish official population figures 2006

Stromiec
Białobrzegi County
Kielce Voivodeship (1919–1939)